Karl Theodor von Heigel (23 August 1842 in Munich – 23 March 1915 in Munich) was a German historian. He was the brother of novelist Karl August von Heigel.

He studied history at the University of Munich, obtaining his habilitation for history in 1873. In 1879 he became an associate professor, and several years later, a full professor at the Polytechnic Institute in Munich. In 1885 he was appointed professor and director of the historical seminary at the university.

In 1876 he became a member of the Bavarian Academy of Sciences. With Hermann von Grauert, he was editor of the Historische Abhandlungen (from 1891).

Selected works 
 Das Herzogthum Bayern zur Zeit Heinrichs des Löwen und Ottos I. von Wittelsbach (with Sigmund von Riezler, 1867) – The Duchy of Bavaria at the time of Henry the Lion and Otto I of Wittelsbach.
 Ludwig I. König von Bayern, 1872 – Ludwig I of Bavaria.
 Der Oesterreichische Erbfolgestreit und die Kaiserwahl Karls VII, 1877 – The Austrian Succession dispute and the imperial election of Charles VII.
 Die Wittelsbacher. Festschrift zur Feier des siebenhundertjährigen Regierungs-Jubiläums des Hauses Wittelsbach, 1880 – The Wittelsbacher. Festschrift in honor of 700 years of the Wittelsbach dynasty.
 Münchens Geschichte 1158–1806, 1880 – Munich history from 1158 to 1806. 
 Quellen und Abhandlungen zur neuern Geschichte Bayerns (2 volumes, 1884–90) – Sources and essays on the modern history of Bavaria.
He was the author of many biographies in the Allgemeine Deutsche Biographie.

References 

1842 births
1915 deaths
Writers from Munich
Ludwig Maximilian University of Munich alumni
Academic staff of the Ludwig Maximilian University of Munich
19th-century German historians
20th-century German historians